Polyteichus is a genus of bryozoans of the order Trepostomata. They are spherical, semi-spherical or disc shaped, with 3 or 4 radiating lobes, being 2–5 cm in diameter. The zooecia are shaped as wide prisms.

Representatives of this genus have been found in the Upper Ordovician of the Czech Republic.

References

External links 
 Paleobiology database
 Definition of zooecia

Trepostomata
Prehistoric bryozoan genera